Globe Trailers is a privately held corporation headquartered in Bradenton, Florida, midway between Tampa and Naples. It is a semi-trailer manufacturer.

History
This heavy equipment-manufacturing company was founded in 1982 and was bought by the Walters family in 2004. When purchased, Globe Trailers was manufacturing 30 trailers per year. In 2010, Globe Trailers produced over 400 trailers. Today, Globe Trailers designs and manufactures Lowboys, Dump, Sliding Axle, Tag, Flatbeds, Single Drops, Custom, and Military trailers in the United States.

References

External links
Official website

Privately held companies based in Florida
Companies based in Manatee County, Florida
1982 establishments in Florida
American companies established in 1982